Victor Hugo Silva Braga (born 17 February 1992) is a Brazilian football player who plays for Saudi Arabian club Al-Tai.

Club career
He made his professional debut in the Primeira Liga for Moreirense on 15 May 2016 in a game against Marítimo.

References

External links

1992 births
Sportspeople from Salvador, Bahia
Living people
Brazilian footballers
Brazilian expatriate footballers
Expatriate footballers in Portugal
Expatriate footballers in Saudi Arabia
Brazilian expatriate sportspeople in Portugal
Brazilian expatriate sportspeople in Saudi Arabia
A.C. Alcanenense players
Uberaba Sport Club players
Gondomar S.C. players
U.D. Leiria players
Moreirense F.C. players
F.C. Famalicão players
S.C. Freamunde players
S.C. Espinho players
F.C. Arouca players
Al-Tai FC players
Liga Portugal 2 players
Primeira Liga players
Campeonato de Portugal (league) players
Saudi Professional League players
Association football goalkeepers